Zwickau (is, with around 87,500 inhabitants (2020), the fourth-largest city of Saxony after Leipzig, Dresden and Chemnitz and it is the seat of the Zwickau District. The West Saxon city is situated in the valley of the Zwickau Mulde (German: Zwickauer Mulde;), and lies in a string of cities sitting in the densely populated foreland of the Elster and Ore Mountains stretching from Plauen in the southwest via Zwickau, Chemnitz and Freiberg to Dresden in the northeast. From 1834 until 1952, Zwickau was the seat of the government of the south-western region of Saxony.

The name of the city is of Sorbian origin and may refer to Svarog, the Slavic god of fire and of the sun. Zwickau is the seat of the West Saxon University of Zwickau (German: Westsächsische Hochschule Zwickau) with campuses in Zwickau, Markneukirchen, Reichenbach im Vogtland and Schneeberg (Erzgebirge). The city is the birthplace of composer Robert Schumann.

As cradle of Audi's forerunner Horch and as seat of the Sachsenring company which produced (then still as VEB Sachsenring Automobilwerke Zwickau) East Germany's most popular car, the Trabant, Zwickau has historically been one of the centres of the German automotive industry, with a tradition over one hundred years old, including other car makers like Auto Union and Volkswagen.

The Silver Road, Saxony's longest tourist route, connects Dresden with Zwickau.

Zwickau can be reached by car via the nearby Autobahns A4 and A72, the main railway station (Zwickau Hauptbahnhof), via a public airfield which takes light aircraft, and by bike along river the Zwickau Mulde River on the so-called Mulderadweg.

History

The region around Zwickau was settled by Sorbs as early as the 7th century AD. The name Zwickau is probably a Germanization of the Sorbian toponym Šwikawa, which derives from Svarozič, the Slavic Sun and fire god. In the 10th century, German settlers began arriving and the native Slavs were Germanized. A trading place known as terretorio Zcwickaw (in Medieval Latin) was mentioned in 1118. The settlement received a town charter in 1212, and hosted Franciscans and Cistercians during the 13th century. Zwickau was a free imperial city from 1290 to 1323, but was subsequently granted to the Margraviate of Meissen. Although regional mining began in 1316, extensive mining increased with the discovery of silver in the Schneeberg in 1470. Because of the silver ore deposits in the Erzgebirge, Zwickau developed in the 15th and 16th centuries and grew to be an important economic and cultural centre of Saxony.

The church contains an altar with wood carvings, eight paintings by Michael Wohlgemuth and a pietà in carved and painted wood by Peter Breuer.

The late Gothic church of St. Catharine has an altar piece ascribed to Lucas Cranach the elder, and is remembered because Thomas Müntzer was once pastor there (1520–22). The city hall was begun in 1404 and rebuilt many times since. The municipal archives include documents dating back to the 13th century.

Early printed books from the Middle Ages, historical documents, letters and books are kept in the City Archives (e.g. Meister Singer volumes by Hans Sachs (1494–1576)), and in the School Library founded by scholars and by the city clerk Stephan Roth during the Reformation.

In 1520 Martin Luther dedicated his treatise "On the Freedom of the Christian Man" to his friend Hermann Muehlpfort, the Lord Mayor of Zwickau. The Anabaptist movement of 1525 began at Zwickau under the inspiration of the "Zwickau prophets". After Wittenberg, it became the first city in Europe to join the Lutheran Reformation. The late Gothic Gewandhaus (cloth merchants' hall), was built in 1522–24 and is now converted into a theatre. The city was seriously damaged during the Thirty Years' War.

The old city of Zwickau, perched on a hill, is surrounded by heights with extensive forests and a municipal park. Near the city are the Hartenstein area, for example, with Stein and Wolfsbrunn castles and the Prinzenhöhle cave, as well as the Auersberg peak (1019 meters) and the winter sports areas around Johanngeorgenstadt and the Vogtland.

In the Old Town the Cathedral and the Gewandhaus (cloth merchants' hall) originate in the 16th century and when Schneeberg silver was traded. In the 19th century the city's economy was driven by industrial coal mining and later by automobile manufacturing.

During World War II, in 1942, a Nazi show trial of the members of the  Polish underground resistance organization from Gostyń was held in Zwickau, after which 12 members were executed in Dresden, and several dozen were imprisoned in Nazi concentration camps, where 37 of them died. A subcamp of the Flossenbürg concentration camp was located in Zwickau, whose prisoners were mostly Poles and Russians, but also Italians, French, Hungarians, Jews, Czechs, Germans and others.

On 17 April 1945, US troops entered the city. They withdrew on 30 June 1945 and handed Zwickau to the Soviet Red Army. Between 1944 and 2003, the city had a population of over 100,000.

A major employer is Volkswagen which assembles its ID.3, ID.4 and ID.5 models, as well as Audi and Cupra EV's in the Zwickau-Mosel vehicle plant.

Economic history

Coal mining
Coal mining is mentioned as early as 1348. However, mining on an industrial scale first started in the early 19th century. The coal mines of Zwickau and the neighbouring Oelsnitz-Lugau coalfield contributed significantly to the industrialisation of the region and the city.

In 1885 Carl Wolf invented an improved gas-detecting safety mining-lamp. He held the first world patent for it. Together with his business partner Friemann he founded the "Friemann & Wolf" factory. Coal mining ceased in 1978. About 230 million tonnes had been mined to a depth of over 1,000 metres. In 1992 Zwickau's last coke oven plant was closed.

Many industrial branches developed in the city in the wake of the coal mining industry: mining equipment, iron and steel works, textile, machinery in addition to chemical, porcelain, paper, glass, dyestuffs, wire goods, tinware, stockings, and curtains. There were also steam saw-mills, diamond and glass polishing works, iron-foundries, and breweries.

Automotive industry
In 1904 the Horch automobile plant was founded, followed by the Audi factory in 1909. In 1932 both brands were incorporated into Auto Union but retained their independent trademarks. The Auto Union racing cars, developed by Ferdinand Porsche and Robert Eberan von Eberhorst, driven by Bernd Rosemeyer, Hans Stuck, Tazio Nuvolari, Ernst von Delius, became well known all over the world. During World War II, the Nazi government operated a satellite camp of the Flossenbürg concentration camp in Zwickau which was sited near the Horch Auto Union plant. The Nazi administration built a hard labour prison camp at Osterstein Castle. Both camps were liberated by the US Army in 1945. On 1 August 1945 military administration was handed over to the Soviet Army. The Auto Union factories of Horch and Audi were dismantled by the Soviets; Auto Union relocated to Ingolstadt, Bavaria, evolving into the present day Audi company. In 1948 all large companies were seized by the East German government.

With the founding of the German Democratic Republic in 1949 in East Germany, post-war reconstruction began. In 1958 the Horch and Audi factories were merged into the Sachsenring plant. At the Sachsenring automotive plant the compact Trabant cars were manufactured. These small cars had a two-cylinder, two-stroke engine. The car was the first vehicle in the world to be industrially manufactured with a plastic car body. The former VEB Sachsenring manufacturing site was acquired by Volkswagen in 1990 and has since been redeveloped as an engine and transmission manufacturing facility.

Audi-AG together with the city of Zwickau operates the August Horch Museum in the former Audi works.

Uranium mining
Two major industrial facilities of the Soviet SDAG Wismut were situated in the city: the uranium mill in Zwickau-Crossen, producing uranium concentrate from ores mined in the Erzgebirge and Thuringia, and the machine building plant in Zwickau-Cainsdorf producing equipment for the uranium mines and mills of East Germany. Uranium milling ended in 1989, and after the unification the Wismut machine building plant was sold to a private investor.

Boundaries
Zwickau is bounded by Mülsen, Reinsdorf, Wilkau-Hasslau, Hirschfeld (Verwaltungsgemeinschaft Kirchberg), Lichtentanne, Werdau, Neukirchen, Crimmitschau, Dennheritz (Verwaltungsgemeinschaft Crimmitschau) and the city of Glauchau.

Incorporations
 1895: Pölbitz
 1902: Marienthal
 1905: Eckersbach
 1922: Weissenborn
 1923: Schedewitz
 1939: Brand and Bockwa
 1944: Oberhohndorf and Planitz
 1953: Auerbach, Pöhlau and Niederhohndorf
 1993: Hartmannsdorf
 1996: Rottmannsdorf
 1996: Crossen (with 4 municipalities on January 1, 1994, Schneppendorf)
 1999: Cainsdorf, Mosel, Oberrothenbach and Schlunzig along with Hüttelsgrün (Lichtentanne) and Freiheitssiedlung

Population

Economy
The production of the Trabant was discontinued after German reunification, but Volkswagen built a new factory, and Sachsenring is now a supplier for the automobile industry. Nowadays the headquarters of the Volkswagen-Saxony Ltd. (a VW subsidiary) is in the northern part of Zwickau.

Education
Zwickau is home to the University of Applied Sciences Zwickau with about 4700 students and two campuses within the boundaries of Zwickau.

Dr. Martin Luther School (German: Dr. Martin Luther Schule) is a grade 1-4 school of the Evangelical Lutheran Free Church in Zwickau.

Politics

Mayor and city council
The first freely elected mayor after German reunification was Rainer Eichhorn of the Christian Democratic Union (CDU), who served from 1990 to 2001. The mayor was originally chosen by the city council, but since 1994 has been directly elected. Dietmar Vettermann, also of the CDU, served from 2001 until 2008. He was succeeded by Pia Findeiß of the Social Democratic Party (SPD), who was in office until 2020. The most recent mayoral election was held on 20 September 2020, with a runoff held on 11 October, at which Constance Arndt (Bürger für Zwickau) was elected.

The most recent city council election was held on 26 May 2019, and the results were as follows:

! colspan=2| Party
! Votes
! %
! +/-
! Seats
! +/-
|-
| bgcolor=| 
| align=left| Christian Democratic Union (CDU)
| 25,267
| 22.0
|  11.7
| 11
|  6
|-
| bgcolor=| 
| align=left| Alternative for Germany (AfD)
| 25,112
| 21.9
|  13.0
| 11
|  7
|-
| bgcolor=| 
| align=left| The Left (Die Linke)
| 16,853
| 14.7
|  6.5
| 8
|  3
|-
| 
| align=left| Citizens for Zwickau (BfZ)
| 12,359
| 10.8
|  1.9
| 5
|  1
|-
| bgcolor=| 
| align=left| Social Democratic Party (SPD)
| 11,726
| 10.2
|  5.3
| 5
|  2
|-
| bgcolor=| 
| align=left| Alliance 90/The Greens (Grüne)
| 7,503
| 6.5
|  1.1
| 3
|  1
|-
| bgcolor=| 
| align=left| Free Democratic Party (FDP)
| 6,368
| 5.5
|  1.3
| 3
|  1
|-
| bgcolor=| 
| align=left| Human Environment Animal Protection (tier)
| 4,181
| 3.6
| New
| 1
| New
|-
| 
| align=left| Future Zwickau
| 3,266
| 2.8
| New
| 1
| New
|-
| bgcolor=| 
| align=left| Free Voters (FW)
| 1,397
| 1.2
|  1.1
| 0
|  1
|-
| bgcolor=| 
| align=left| Blue #TeamPetry
| 897
| 0.8
| New
| 0
| New
|-
! colspan=2| Valid votes
! 39,514
! 97.8
! 
! 
! 
|-
! colspan=2| Invalid votes
! 876
! 2.2
! 
! 
! 
|-
! colspan=2| Total
! 40,390
! 100.0
! 
! 48
! ±0
|-
! colspan=2| Electorate/voter turnout
! 73,497
! 55.0
!  13.8
! 
! 
|-
| colspan=7| Source: Wahlen in Sachsen
|}

Historical mayors

 1501–1518: Erasmus Stella
 1518–1530: Hermann Mühlpfort
 1800, 1802, 1804, 1806, 1808, 1810, 1812, 1814: Carl Wilhelm Ferber
 1801, 1803, 1805, 1807, 1809, 1811, 1813, 1815, 1817, 1819: Tobias Hempel
 1816, 1818, 1820, 1822: Christian Gottlieb Haugk
 1821, 1823, 1825, 1826: Carl Heinrich Rappius
 1824 – Christian Heinrich Pinther
 1827–1830: Christian Heinrich Mühlmann, Stadtvogt
 1830–1832: Franz Adolf Marbach
 1832–1860: Friedrich Wilhelm Meyer
 1860–1898: Lothar Streit, from 1874 Lord Mayor
 1898–1919: Karl Keil
 1919–1934: Richard Holz
 1934–1945: Ewald Dost
 1945: Fritz Weber (acting Lord Mayor)
 1945: Georg Ulrich Handke (1894-1962) (acting Lord Mayor)
 1945–1949: Paul Müller
 1949–1954: Otto Assmann (1901-1977)
 1954–1958: Otto Schneider
 1958–1969: Gustav Seifried
 1969–1973: Liesbeth Windisch
 1973–1977: Helmut Repmann
 1977–1990: Heiner Fischer (1936-2016)
 1990–2001: Rainer Eichhorn (born 1950)
 2001–2008: Dietmar Vettermann (born 1957)
 2008 – until now Pia Findeiss (born 1956)

Transport

The city is close to the A4 (Dresden-Erfurt) and A72 (Hof-Chemnitz) Autobahns.

Zwickau Hauptbahnhof is on the Dresden–Werdau line, part of the Saxon-Franconian trunk line, connecting Nuremberg and Dresden. There are further railway connections to Leipzig as well as Karlovy Vary and Cheb in the Czech Republic. The core element of Zwickau's urban public transport system is the Zwickau tramway network; the system is also the prototype of the so-called Zwickau Model for such systems.

The closest airport is Leipzig-Altenburg, which has no scheduled commercial flights. The nearest major airports are Leipzig/Halle Airport and Dresden Airport, both of which offer a large number of national and international flights.

Museums

In the city centre there are three museums: an art museum from the 19th century and the houses of priests from 13th century, both located next to St. Mary's church. Just around the corner there is the Robert-Schumann museum. The museums offer different collections dedicated to the history of the city, as well as art and a mineralogical, palaeontological and geological collection with many specimens from the city and the nearby Ore Mountains.

Zwickau is the birthplace of the composer Robert Schumann. The house where he was born in 1810 still stands in the marketplace. This is now called Robert Schumann House and is a museum dedicated to him.

The histories of the Audi and Horch automobile factories are presented at the August Horch Museum Zwickau. The museum is an Anchor Point of the European Route of Industrial Heritage (EIRH).

Notable people

Born before 1900
Nicholas Storch (before 1500 – after 1536), weaver and lay preacher (Zwickau Prophets)
Janus Cornarius (c. 1500–1558), philologist and physicians
Gregor Haloander (1501–1531), jurist
David Köler (1532–1565), musician, organist, choirmaster, composer
Jacob Leupold (1674–1727), mechanic and instrument maker
Robert Schumann (1810–1856), composer of the romantic era
Heinrich Schurtz (1863–1903), ethnologist and historian
August Horch (1868–1952), automotive engineer
Heinrich Waentig (1870–1943), economist and politician (SPD)
Hans Dominik (1872–1945), writer, journalist and engineer
Fritz Bleyl (1880–1966), expressionist painter and architect
Max Pechstein (1881–1955), expressionist painter
"Margaret Scott" (1888–1973), militant suffragette in London
Paul Langheinrich (1895–1979), genealogist

Born after 1900

Robert Eberan von Eberhorst (1902–1982), Austrian automotive engineer
Gershom Schocken (1912–1990), Israeli journalist and politician
Gert Fröbe (1913–1988), actor
Gerhard Schürer (1921–2010), politician (SED)
Rolf Hädrich (1931–2000), film director and screenwriter
Dieter F. Uchtdorf (born 1940), Second Counselor in the Church of Jesus Christ of Latter-day Saints, lived here following World War II
Harald Fritzsch (born 1943), theoretical physicist (quantum theory)
Volkmar Weiss (born 1944), geneticists, social historian and genealogist
Jürgen Croy (born 1946), footballer
Christoph Bergner (born 1948), politician (CDU), 1993-1994 Prime Minister of Saxony-Anhalt
Eckart Viehweg (1948–2010), mathematician
Hagen von Ortloff (born 1949), TV-journalist
Werner Schulz (1950–2022), politician (Alliance 90/The Greens)
Frank Petzold (born 1951), composer and conductor
Christoph Daum (born 1953), football player and coach
Lutz Dombrowski (born 1959), athlete and Olympic champion
Lars Riedel (born 1967), discus thrower
Sven Günther (born 1974), footballer
Cathleen Martini (born 1982), bobsledder, world champion
Marie-Elisabeth Hecker (born 1987), classical cellist
Kristin Gierisch (born 1990), triple jumper

Twin towns – sister cities

Zwickau is twinned with:
 Jablonec nad Nisou, Czech Republic (1971)
 Zaanstad, Netherlands (1987)
 Dortmund, Germany (1988)
 Volodymyr, Ukraine (2014)
 Yandu (Yancheng), China (2014)

See also
SV Cainsdorf

References

External links

 Zwickau  
 August-Horch Museum at Audi Works 

 
Zwickau (district)